Sree Padmanabhadasa Sree Moolam Thirunal Rama Varma (born 12 June 1949) is the current titular Maharajah of Travancore. He is the youngest of the four children of the former titular Maharani of Travancore, Sree Padmanabhasevini Maharani Karthika Thirunal Lakshmi Bayi and her husband, Prince Consort Lt. Col. G. V. Raja of Poonjar Royal House.

Rama Varma is the only nephew of the last reigning King of Travancore, Sree Chithira Thirunal Balarama Varma and succeeded the late titular Maharaja of Travancore, Sree Padmanabhadasa Sree Uthradom Thirunal Marthanda Varma. He is the managing director of the family owned spice trading company, Aspinwall Ltd. As the head of the royal family, he along with his consort, moved to Thiruvananthapuram in 2013 and has settled down at Kowdiar Palace, in order to keep up with the ritual duties of being the custodian of the Sree Padmanabhaswamy Temple.

Early life 

Rama Varma is the youngest son of Maharani Karthika Thirunal Lakshmi Bayi of Travancore and her husband, Prince Consort Lt. Col. G. V. Raja, and was born on 12 June 1949 in Thiru-Kochi. His siblings are the late Crown Prince (Elayarajah) Sree Padmanabhadasa Sree Avittom Thirunal Rama Varma (died at the age of 6 due to rheumatic heart disease, long before he was born), Princess Pooyam Thirunal Gowri Parvathi Bayi and the writer, Princess Aswathi Thirunal Gowri Lakshmi Bayi. Like his father, Lt. Col. G. V. Raja,  Rama Varma is also an avid sports and book lover. He was educated privately by selected tutors in various subjects. He later graduated from Mar Ivanios College, Thiruvananthapuram, with Physics as his selective subject. Then he moved to Kolkata and worked there for some years. He then went to England to learn business management and worked there for an year.

Later life and marriage 

After finishing his higher education and working in England, Rama Varma returned to India in 1972 and, at his uncles' advise, joined the spice trading company Aspinwall Ltd in Mangalore. Rama Varma served as a consultant and in various executive positions like, Additional Director (2004–2005), Director of Planning (2005–2007), Executive Director Aspinwall & Co Travancore Ltd (since 2005), Member of Aspinwall Promoter Group (since 2005), managing director of Aspinwall and Co Ltd in Mangalore (since 2008). In 2002 he married Ammachi Panapillai Amma Srimathi Girija Thankachi of Vazhuthacadu, alias Dr. Girija Rama Varma, former radiologist based in London. After their 2002 wedding the couple lived in Mangalore until 2013. After Rama Varma assumed the Titular Maharajah's position (due to his maternal uncle's death), they moved to Kowdiar, Trivandrum. He is childless. According to an insider's account, as the current Maharaja is without issue and according to the matrilineal rules of descent in the family, the next in line of succession would be his nephews, the sons of the princesses of Travancore. Therefore, Maharaja Mulam Thirunal Ramavarma's nephews Prince Ravi, Prince Raghu and Prince Aditya are expected to be the successors from the Trivandrum branch of the family. Prince Balagopala and Prince Jay are the Elaya Rajas from the Bangalore line of the family

Titular Maharajah of Travancore 

Rama Varma became the Elayarajah of Travancore when Maharajah Sree Chithira Thirunal Balarama Varma died on 20 July 1991. And when Sree Uthradom Thirunal Marthanda Varma died on 16 December 2013, he became the Titular Maharajah of Travancore. He was appointed after a function called Thirumudikalasam, as the head of the Travancore Royal Family on 3 January 2014, was held at Kalasamandapam near the Sree Padmanabhaswamy Temple. After rituals and traditional procedures, Tharananalloor Parameswaran Namboodiripad, the temple Tantri (high priest), poured 'punyajalam' (holy water) over Rama Varma, making him the new head of the royal family. The anointment function was a very private affair and only the closest family members and priests took part in it. Rama Varma, as of now, is also the supreme guardian or custodian of Sree Padmanabhaswamy Temple, Thiruvananthapuram. After his installation, he arrived at the Kulasekhara Mandapam of the temple where the Ettara Yogam presided over by the Pushpanjali Swamiyar held a meeting. The Yogam recognised Rama Varma as Chirava Mooppan and Thrippappoor Mooppan, and the Swamiyar signed on the neettu. His full title is : His Highness Sree Padmanabha Dasa Vanchipala Sree Moolam Thirunal Rama Varma, Kulasekhara Kiritapati Manney, Maharajah of Travancore.

See also

 G. V. Raja
 Travancore Royal Family
 Maharajah
 Thampi and Thankachi
 Panapillai Amma

References

External links
 H.H Sree Moolam Thirunal Rama Varma Reflections Lakshadeepam 2014 Youtube.com
 Moolam Thirunal anointed head of Travancore royal house Youtube.com

1949 births
Living people
Maharajas of Travancore